Atakişili (also, Atakishili and Atakishily) is a village and municipality in the Kurdamir Rayon of Azerbaijan.

References 

Kuedamir

Populated places in Kurdamir District